Alechaung is a village in the Magway Region of north-west Myanmar. It lies in Mindon Township in the Thayet District.

See also
List of cities, towns and villages in Burma: A

References

Populated places in Magway Region